Louis Lumière is a 66-minute filmed conversation between Henri Langlois, founder and director of the Cinémathèque Française, and the film director Jean Renoir. It was directed by Éric Rohmer in 1968.

External links

1968 films
Auguste and Louis Lumière
Films directed by Éric Rohmer
French documentary films
Documentary films about film directors and producers
1960s French films